Percival Arthur Sparks (18 October 1887 – 18 April 1953) was an Australian rules footballer who played with Richmond in the Victorian Football League (VFL).

Family
The son of Arthur Hamilton Sparks (1864-1908), and Abbey Maria Sparks (1859-1903), née Carolan, Percival Arthur Sparks was born at Allendale, Victoria on 18 October 1887.

He married Mary Josephine Chisholm on 11 May 1916.

Death
He died on 18 April 1953.

Notes

References
 
 Tribute to OTBA Identity, The Sporting Globe, (Wednesday, 6 July 1949), p.18.</ref>

External links 

1887 births
1953 deaths
Australian rules footballers from Victoria (Australia)
Richmond Football Club players
Stawell Football Club players